Rolfodon bracheri is an extinct species from the family Chlamydoselachidae. It lived during the Miocene.

R. bracheri was named by Pfeil in 1983. Originally it was described as a species belonging to the genus Chlamydoselachus; Cappetta, Morrison & Adnet (2019) transferred it to the chlamydoselachid genus Rolfodon.

References 

Chlamydoselachidae
Miocene fish
Fish described in 1983